Conrad of Urslingen may refer to:

Conrad I, Duke of Spoleto (1195–1198)
Conrad II, Duke of Spoleto, son of prec.
Conrad III, Duke of Spoleto, called Conrad Guiscard, son of prec.